The Arado Ar 95 was a single-engine reconnaissance and patrol biplane designed and built by the German firm Arado Flugzeugwerke in the late 1930s. Ordered by Chile and Turkey, a number were taken over by the Kriegsmarine (German Navy) when World War II started.

Development
The Arado Ar 95 was designed in 1935 as a two-seat seaplane, for coastal patrol, reconnaissance and light attack roles. The first prototype, an all-metal biplane powered by a BMW 132 radial engine, flew in 1936, while a second prototype was powered by a Junkers Jumo 210 liquid-cooled engine. The two prototypes were evaluated against the similar Focke-Wulf Fw 62. The BMW-powered version was considered worthy of further study, and a batch of six was sent for further evaluation with the Legion Condor during the Spanish Civil War.

The Arado Ar 95 was the basis for the prototype Ar 195 carrier-based torpedo bomber, which was proposed for operation from the German aircraft carrier .

Operational history

The Ar 95 was not ordered by the German armed forces, and so was offered for export in two versions, the Ar 95W floatplane and Ar 95L landplane, with a fixed, spatted undercarriage. Six Ar 95Ls were ordered by the Chilean Air Force, being delivered prior to the start of World War II.  Turkey placed an order for Ar 95Ws, but these were taken over by Germany at the outbreak of war.

The requisitioned Ar 95s were designated by the Luftwaffe as the Ar 95A, and were used for training, and also for coastal reconnaissance operations in the Baltic Sea, operating off the coast of Latvia and Estonia in 1941, and in the Gulf of Finland. They continued operating until late 1944.

Operators

 Chilean Air Force

 Luftwaffe

 Spanish Air Force

Specifications (Arado 95A-1)

See also

References

Bibliography
 
 
 Gerdessen, Frederik. "Estonian Air Power 1918 – 1945". Air Enthusiast, No. 18, April – July 1982. pp. 61–76. .

1930s German military reconnaissance aircraft
Floatplanes
Ar 095
Biplanes
Single-engined tractor aircraft
Aircraft first flown in 1937